Maripasoula Airport  is an airport  north of Maripasoula, a commune in the arrondissement of Saint-Laurent-du-Maroni in French Guiana. It is near the Lawa River, which forms the border between French Guiana and Suriname.

The Maripasoula non-directional beacon (Ident: MP) is located on the field.

Airlines and destinations

Statistics

See also

 List of airports in French Guiana
 Transport in French Guiana

References

External links
OpenStreetMap - Maripasoula
SkyVector - Maripasoula Airport

Airports in French Guiana
Buildings and structures in Maripasoula